Mark Hughes is an Irish former professional footballer who played as a midfielder.

Career

Hughes signed for English club Scunthorpe United from Belvedere in August 2012. He made his debut against Notts County on 4 September 2012. He retired in May 2022, aged 29, due to injury.

References

External links

1993 births
Living people
Republic of Ireland association footballers
Scunthorpe United F.C. players
Belvedere F.C. players
Republic of Ireland youth international footballers
Association football midfielders
Athlone Town A.F.C. players
Drogheda United F.C. players
Longford Town F.C. players
Shelbourne F.C. players
League of Ireland players